Samuel Connor Hornby (born 2 February 1995) is an English professional footballer who plays as a goalkeeper for  club Colchester United.

He spent his youth with Hednesford Town and Redditch United, before turning professional at Burton Albion in June 2015. He spent the 2015–16 and 2016–17 seasons on loan at Brackley Town and Kidderminster Harriers respectively, before he was transferred to Port Vale in June 2017. He was loaned out to Chester in December 2017 and left the club permanently to sign for Bradford City in May 2019. He was loaned out to AFC Fylde in October 2019 and Colchester United in January 2022, before joining Colchester on a permanent basis six months later.

Career

Burton Albion
Hornby played for the youth teams at Hednesford Town and Redditch United, before turning professional after signing a one-year contract with Jimmy Floyd Hasselbaink's Burton Albion in June 2015. He joined National League North side Brackley Town on an initial one-month loan in October 2015, and went on to remain an ever-present for the rest of the 2015–16 season as the "Saints" successfully avoided relegation. Brackley manager Kevin Wilkin named him as his player of the season, and Hornby also picked up the club's player's player of the season award.

Speaking in May 2016, Nigel Clough said that "he's impressed us very much since we've come in", and "the plan with him is to get him out on loan, if we can do, to League Two or the National League". He returned on loan to the National League North in June 2016 with newly relegated club Kidderminster Harriers. Harriers ended the 2016–17 season in second place, and lost out to Chorley in the play-off semi-finals; manager John Eustace praised Hornby's performance in the play-offs.

Port Vale
Hornby signed a two-year contract with EFL League Two club Port Vale in June 2017. He faced competition for the first team spot from Rob Lainton, Ryan Boot, and Joe Slinn. He made his debut for the "Valiants" in the first round of the EFL Cup on 9 August, coming on for Lainton – who had suffered a serious thigh injury – at half-time during a 4–1 defeat to Leeds United at Elland Road. He made his debut in the English Football League three days later, in a 3–2 loss to Wycombe Wanderers at Vale Park, and with Hornby conceding six goals within the space of 135 minutes, manager Michael Brown said that he was considering signing a new goalkeeper as Hornby was thrown "in the deep end" despite being "a young boy" with "a good future." Hornby picked up an injury in October and was ruled out of action for six weeks. On 7 December, he joined National League club Chester on an initial one-month loan. "Blues" manager Marcus Bignot signed Hornby to provide competition for Alex Lynch, following the departure of back-up goalkeeper Nathan Vaughan. Having established himself in the "Seals" first-team, the loan deal was initially extended by a further month, and then until the end of the 2017–18 season. However he was recalled by Port Vale manager Neil Aspin on 26 February after Lainton picked up an injury. He got his chance to stake a first-team place under Aspin after Boot picked up an injury at the start of April. He played well in the end of season run-in to help the club to avoid relegation, leading Aspin to say that "now he has proved a point and now he puts himself in a really good position to compete for the number one jersey next season."

Despite playing well in pre-season friendlies he began the 2018–19 season as back-up to experienced new signing Scott Brown, and was limited to appearances in the group stages of the EFL Trophy. Brown went on to be named as the club's Player of the Year whilst Hornby was restricted to reserve team matches despite impressing in those games.

Bradford City
In May 2019, after rejecting a new contract offer from Port Vale, Hornby signed a two-year contract with fellow League Two club Bradford City. He made his debut for the "Bantams" in the EFL Cup on 13 August, in a 4–0 defeat to Preston North End at Valley Parade. He made his second appearance in the EFL Trophy on 3 September, helping Bradford to beat Bolton Wanderers 4–3 on penalties following a 1–1 draw. He moved on loan to AFC Fylde on 7 October after manager Gary Bowyer wanted Hornby to play regular football rather than sit on the bench as cover for Richard O'Donnell. Dave Challinor stated that he brought Hornby to the "Coasters" after goalkeepers James Montgomery and Dan Lavercombe suffered a loss of confidence following Fylde's record of 29 goals conceded in the opening 15 games of the National League season.

Hornby played 21 games in the 2020–21 season, which proved a difficult campaign for the club and one which he described as "a real mixed bag and a test of character" after he replaced an injured Richard O'Donnell in the starting eleven. Joint-managers Mark Trueman and Conor Sellars signed Will Huffer from Bradford (Park Avenue) in January to provide back-up for Hornby rather than attempting to bring in an experienced goalkeeper to replace him in the starting line-up. On 12 May 2021, he was one of four players offered a new contract by Bradford City.

Colchester United
Having featured nine times for Bradford during the first half of the campaign, he joined League Two rivals Colchester United on loan until the end of the 2021–22 season on 31 January 2022; "U's" manager Wayne Brown required goalkeeper cover following suspension to Shamal George, injury concerns with Dean Gerken and the inexperience of Ted Collins. He made a good impression at the Colchester Community Stadium, being named in the League Two Team of the Week for the final of his eight appearances, leading to speculation that he would be a summer transfer target.

His loan spell was made into a permanent one on 28 June after an undisclosed fee was agreed; he signed a two-year contract with Colchester. He said that he was looking forward to battling with George for a first-team place in the 2022–23 campaign.

Career statistics

References

1995 births
Living people
Footballers from Birmingham, West Midlands
English footballers
Association football goalkeepers
Hednesford Town F.C. players
Redditch United F.C. players
Burton Albion F.C. players
Brackley Town F.C. players
Kidderminster Harriers F.C. players
Port Vale F.C. players
Chester F.C. players
Bradford City A.F.C. players
AFC Fylde players
Colchester United F.C. players
National League (English football) players
English Football League players